Kydd is a surname. Notable people with the surname include:

Cynna Kydd, Australian netball player
Garth Kydd, Australian netball player
Jonathan Kydd (academic), British agricultural expert
Jonathan Kydd (actor), British actor
Robbie Kydd, rugby union player
Sam Kydd, Irish-born British actor

See also
Frances Shand Kydd, mother of Diana, Princess of Wales
Peter Shand Kydd, stepfather of Diana, Princess of Wales